U125 or U-125 may refer to:

 German submarine U-125, one of several German submarines
 British Aerospace BAe 125 as used by the Japan Air Self-Defence Force